The men's high jump at the 1976 Summer Olympics took place on July 30 & 31. Thirty-seven athletes from 23 nations competed. The maximum number of athletes per nation had been set at 3 since the 1930 Olympic Congress. The event was won by Jacek Wszoła of Poland, breaking the US/USSR hold on the men's high jump title (no nation other than those two had won since 1948). It was Poland's first medal in the event. Greg Joy's silver was Canada's first medal in the event since 1932. Dwight Stones won his second consecutive bronze medal, becoming the third man to win multiple medals in the high jump and keeping the United States' streak of podium appearances (all 18 editions of the Olympic men's high jump) alive one final time. The Soviet streak of five Games with podium appearances in the event ended.

Background

This was the 18th appearance of the event, which is one of 12 athletics events to have been held at every Summer Olympics. The returning finalists from the 1972 Games were bronze medalist Dwight Stones of the United States and sixth-place finisher István Major of Hungary; the defending champion, Soviet Jüri Tarmak, had retired. Stones was now the best jumper in the world, having broken the world record twice since the last Games. Jesper Tørring of Denmark, the 1974 European champion, was also competing.

Bermuda, Cuba, Nicaragua, and Saudi Arabia each made their debut in the event. The United States appeared for the 18th time, having competed at each edition of the Olympic men's high jump to that point.

Competition format

The competition used the two-round format introduced in 1912. There were two distinct rounds of jumping with results cleared between rounds. Jumpers were eliminated if they had three consecutive failures, whether at a single height or between multiple heights if they attempted to advance before clearing a height.

The qualifying round had the bar set at 2.00 metres, 2.05 metres, 2.10 metres, 2.13 metres, and 2.16 metres. All jumpers clearing 2.16 metres in the qualifying round advanced to the final. If fewer than 12 jumpers could achieve it, the top 12 (including ties) would advance to the final.

The final had jumps at 2.00 metres, 2.05 metres, 2.10 metres, 2.14 metres, 2.18 metres, 2.21 metres, and every 0.02 metres after that until there was a winner.

Records

Prior to this competition, the existing world and Olympic records were as follows.

Jacek Wszoła beat the Olympic record by jumping 2.25 metres.

Schedule

All times are Eastern Daylight Time (UTC-4)

Results

Qualifying

The qualification was set to 2.16 metres. A total of 14 athletes achieved this height.

Final

The rainy weather affected Stones more than anyone else. Two months before the Olympics, he cleared 2.31 metres; five days after the Olympic final, he cleared 2.32 metres. But in the Montreal rain, he failed three times at 2.23 metres. Home crowd hero Joy cleared that height on his final attempt, ultimately gaining silver for it. Budalov tried once unsuccessfully at 2.23 metres before moving on to try 2.25 metres (a very uncommon strategy at that point), failing twice there and settling for fourth place at 2.21 metres. Wszoła, who had not been expected to be a contender, cleared 2.23 metres in his first try. He and Joy each made one jump at 2.25 metres before taking divergent approaches: Wszoła kept at 2.25 metres, passing it on jump #2; Joy went on to 2.27 metres. Each man took two unsuccessful jumps at 2.27, eliminating Joy in second place and leaving Wszoła alone as gold medalist. He used his final attempt at 2.29, with no success.

References

External links
Results

Men's high jump
High jump at the Olympics
Men's events at the 1976 Summer Olympics